Frank Russell Capra (born Francesco Rosario Capra; May 18, 1897 – September 3, 1991) was an Italian-born American film director, producer and writer who became the creative force behind some of the major award-winning films of the 1930s and 1940s. Born in Italy and raised in Los Angeles from the age of five, his rags-to-riches story has led film historians such as Ian Freer to consider him the "American Dream personified".

Capra became one of America's most influential directors during the 1930s, winning three Academy Awards for Best Director from six nominations, along with three other Oscar wins from nine nominations in other categories. Among his leading films were It Happened One Night (1934), Mr. Deeds Goes to Town (1936), You Can't Take It with You (1938), and Mr. Smith Goes to Washington (1939). During World War II, Capra served in the U.S. Army Signal Corps and produced propaganda films, such as the Why We Fight series.

After World War II, Capra's career declined as his later films, such as It's a Wonderful Life (1946), performed poorly when they were first released. In ensuing decades, however, It's a Wonderful Life and other Capra films were revisited favorably by critics. Outside of directing, Capra was active in the film industry, engaging in various political and social activities. He served as President of the Academy of Motion Picture Arts and Sciences, worked alongside the Writers Guild of America, and was head of the Directors Guild of America.

Early life 
Capra was born Francesco Rosario Capra in Bisacquino, a village near Palermo, Sicily, Italy. He was the youngest of seven children of Salvatore Capra, a fruit grower, and the former Rosaria "Serah" Nicolosi. Capra's family was Roman Catholic. The name "Capra", notes Capra's biographer Joseph McBride, represents his family's closeness to the land, and means "goat". He notes that the English word "capricious" derives from it, "evoking the animal's skittish temperament", adding that "the name neatly expresses two aspects of Frank Capra's personality: emotionalism and obstinacy."

In 1903, when he was five, Capra's family emigrated to the United States, traveling in a steerage compartment of the steamship Germania—the least expensive way to make the passage. For Capra, the 13-day journey remained one of the worst experiences of his life:

Capra remembers the ship's arrival in New York Harbor, where he saw "a statue of a great lady, taller than a church steeple, holding a torch above the land we were about to enter". He recalls his father's exclamation at the sight:

The family settled in Los Angeles's East Side (today Lincoln Heights) on avenue 18, which Capra described in his autobiography as an Italian "ghetto". Capra's father worked as a fruit picker and young Capra sold newspapers after school for 10 years, until he graduated from high school. Instead of working after graduating, as his parents wanted, he enrolled in college. He worked through college at the California Institute of Technology, playing banjo at nightclubs and taking odd jobs like working at the campus laundry facility, waiting tables, and cleaning engines at a local power plant. He studied chemical engineering and graduated in the spring of 1918. Capra later wrote that his college education had "changed his whole viewpoint on life from the viewpoint of an alley rat to the viewpoint of a cultured person".

World War I and later 
Soon after graduating from college, Capra was commissioned in the United States Army as a second lieutenant, having completed campus ROTC. In the Army, he taught mathematics to artillerymen at Fort Point, San Francisco. His father died during the war in an accident (1916). In the Army, Capra contracted Spanish flu and was medically discharged to return home to live with his mother. He became a naturalized U.S. citizen in 1920, taking the name Frank Russell Capra. Living at home with his siblings and mother, Capra was the only family member with a college education, yet he was the only one who remained chronically unemployed. After a year without work, seeing how his siblings had steady jobs, he felt he was a failure, which led to bouts of depression.

Chronic abdominal pains were later discovered to have been an undiagnosed burst appendix. After recovering at home, Capra moved out and spent the next few years living in flophouses in San Francisco and hopping freight trains, wandering the Western United States. To support himself, he took odd jobs on farms, as a movie extra, playing poker, and selling local oil well stocks.

During this time the 24-year-old Capra directed a 32-minute documentary film titled La Visita Dell'Incrociatore Italiano Libya a San Francisco. Not only did it document the visit of the Italian naval vessel Libya to San Francisco, but also the reception given to the crew of the ship by San Francisco's L'Italia Virtus Club, now known as the San Francisco Italian Athletic Club.

At 25, Capra took a job selling books written and published by American philosopher Elbert Hubbard. Capra recalled that he "hated being a peasant, being a scrounging new kid trapped in the Sicilian ghetto of Los Angeles. ... All I had was cockiness—and let me tell you that gets you a long way."

Career

Silent film comedies 
During his book sales efforts—and nearly broke—Capra read a newspaper article about a new movie studio opening in San Francisco. Capra phoned them saying he had moved from Hollywood, and falsely implied that he had experience in the budding film industry. Capra's only prior exposure in films was in 1915 while attending Manual Arts High School. The studio's founder, Walter Montague, was nonetheless impressed by Capra and offered him $75 to direct a one-reel silent film. Capra, with the help of a cameraman, made the film in two days and cast it with amateurs.

After that first serious job in films, Capra began efforts to finding similar openings in the film industry. He took a position with another minor San Francisco studio and subsequently received an offer to work with producer Harry Cohn at his new studio in Los Angeles. During this time, he worked as a property man, film cutter, title writer, and assistant director.

Capra later became a gag writer for Hal Roach's Our Gang series. He was twice hired as a writer for a slapstick comedy director, Mack Sennett, in 1918 and 1924. Under him, Capra wrote scripts for comedian Harry Langdon and produced by Mack Sennett, the first being Plain Clothes in 1925. According to Capra, it was he who invented Langdon's character, the innocent fool living in a "naughty world"; however, Langdon was well into this character by 1925.

When Langdon eventually left Sennett to make longer, feature-length movies with First National Studios, he took Capra along as his personal writer and director. They made three feature films together during 1926 and 1927, all of them successful with critics and the public. The films made Langdon a recognized comedian in the caliber of Charlie Chaplin and Buster Keaton. Capra and Langdon later had a falling out following the end of production on Long Pants (1927), and Capra was fired. During the following years, Langdon's films went into decline without Capra's assistance. After splitting with Langdon, Capra directed a picture for First National, For the Love of Mike (1927). This was a silent comedy about three bickering godfathers—a German, a Jew, and an Irishman—starring a budding actress, Claudette Colbert. The movie was considered a failure and is a lost film.

Columbia Pictures 
Capra returned to Harry Cohn's studio, now named Columbia Pictures, which was then producing short films and two-reel comedies for "fillers" to play between main features. Columbia was one of many start-up studios on "Poverty Row" in Los Angeles. Like the others, Columbia was unable to compete with larger studios, which often had their own production facilities, distribution, and theaters. Cohn rehired Capra in 1928 to help his studio produce new, full-length feature films, to compete with the major studios. Capra would eventually direct 20 films for Cohn's studio, including many of his classics.

Because of Capra's engineering education, he adapted more easily to the new sound technology than most directors. He welcomed the transition to sound, recalling, "I wasn't at home in silent films." Most studios were unwilling to invest in the new sound technology, assuming it was a passing fad. Many in Hollywood considered sound a threat to the industry and hoped it would pass quickly; McBride notes that "Capra was not one of them." When he saw Al Jolson singing in The Jazz Singer in 1927, considered the first talkie, Capra recalled his reaction:

Few of the studio heads or crew were aware of Capra's engineering background until he began directing The Younger Generation in 1929. The chief cinematographer who worked with Capra on a number of films was likewise unaware. He describes this early period in sound for film:

During his first year with Columbia, Capra directed nine films, some of which were successful. After the first few, Harry Cohn said: "it was the beginning of Columbia making a better quality of pictures." According to Barson, "Capra became ensconced as Harry Cohn's most trusted director." His films soon established Capra as a "bankable" director known throughout the industry, and Cohn raised Capra's initial salary of $1,000 per film to $25,000 per year. Capra directed a film for MGM during this period, but soon realized he "had much more freedom under Harry Cohn's benevolent dictatorship", where Cohn also put Capra's "name above the title" of his films, a first for the movie industry. Capra wrote of this period and recalled the confidence that Cohn placed in Capra's vision and directing:

Capra directed his first "real" sound picture, The Younger Generation, in 1929. It was a rags-to-riches romantic comedy about a Jewish family's upward mobility in New York City, with their son later trying to deny his Jewish roots to keep his rich, gentile girlfriend. According to Capra biographer Joseph McBride, Capra "obviously felt a strong identification with the story of a Jewish immigrant who grows up in the ghetto of New York ... and feels he has to deny his ethnic origins to rise to success in America." Capra, however, denied any connection of the story with his own life.

Nonetheless, McBride insists that The Younger Generation abounds with parallels to Capra's own life. McBride notes the "devastatingly painful climactic scene", where the young social-climbing son, embarrassed when his wealthy new friends first meet his parents, passes his mother and father off as house servants. That scene, notes McBride, "echoes the shame Capra admitted feeling toward his own family as he rose in social status".

During his years at Columbia, Capra worked often with screenwriter Robert Riskin (husband of Fay Wray), and cameraman Joseph Walker. In many of Capra's films, the wise-cracking and sharp dialogue was often written by Riskin, and he and Capra went on to become Hollywood's "most admired writer-director team".

Film career (1934–1941)

It Happened One Night (1934) 

Capra's films in the 1930s enjoyed immense success at the Academy Awards. It Happened One Night (1934) became the first film to win all five top Oscars (Best Picture, Best Director, Best Actor, Best Actress, and Best Adapted Screenplay). Written by Robert Riskin, it is one of the first screwball comedies, and with its release in the Great Depression, critics considered it an escapist story and a celebration of the American Dream. The film established the names of Capra, Columbia Pictures, and stars Clark Gable and Claudette Colbert in the movie industry. The film has been called "picaresque". It was one of the earliest road movies and inspired variations on that theme by other filmmakers.

He followed the film with Broadway Bill (1934), a screwball comedy about horse racing. The film was a turning point for Capra, however, as he began to conceive an additional dimension to his movies. He started using his films to convey messages to the public. Capra explains his new thinking:

This added goal was inspired after meeting with a Christian Scientist friend who told him to view his talents in a different way:

Capra began to embody messages in subsequent films, many of which conveyed "fantasies of goodwill". The first of those was Mr. Deeds Goes to Town (1936), for which Capra won his second Best Director Oscar. Critic Alistair Cooke observed that Capra was "starting to make movies about themes instead of people".

In 1938, Capra won his third Director Oscar in five years for You Can't Take It with You, which also won Best Picture. In addition to his three directing wins, Capra received directing nominations for three other films (Lady for a Day, Mr. Smith Goes to Washington, and It's a Wonderful Life). On May 5, 1936, Capra hosted the 8th Academy Awards ceremony.

Mr. Smith Goes to Washington (1939) 
Although It's a Wonderful Life is his best-known film, Friedman notes that it was Mr. Smith Goes to Washington (1939), which most represented the "Capra myth". That film expressed Capra's patriotism more than any others, and "presented the individual working within the democratic system to overcome rampant political corruption".

The film, however, became Capra's most controversial. In his research before filming, he was able to stand close to President Franklin D. Roosevelt during a press conference after the recent acts of war by Germany in Europe. Capra recalls his fears:

When the filming was completed, the studio sent preview copies to Washington. Joseph P. Kennedy Sr., U.S. ambassador to the UK, wrote to Columbia head Harry Cohn, "Please do not play this picture in Europe." Politicians were concerned about the potential negative effect the film might have on the morale of the United States' allies, as World War II had begun. Kennedy wrote to President Roosevelt that, "In foreign countries this film must inevitably strengthen the mistaken impression that the United States is full of graft, corruption and lawlessness." Many studio heads agreed, nor did they want negative feelings about Hollywood instilled in political leaders.

Nonetheless, Capra's vision of the film's significance was clear:

Capra pleaded with Cohn to allow the film to go into distribution and remembers the intensity of their decision making:

Cohn and Capra chose to ignore the negative publicity and demands and released the film as planned. It was later nominated for 11 Academy Awards, only winning one (for Best Original Story) partly because the number of major pictures that were nominated that year was 10, including The Wizard of Oz and Gone with the Wind. Hollywood columnist Louella Parsons called it a "smash patriotic hit" and most critics agreed, seeing that audiences left the theaters with "an enthusiasm for democracy" and "in a glow of patriotism".

The significance of the film's message was established further in France, shortly after World War II began. When the French public was asked to select which film they wanted to see most, having been told by the Vichy government that soon no more American films would be allowed in France, the overwhelming majority chose it over all others. To a France soon to be invaded and occupied by Nazi forces, the film most expressed the "perseverance of democracy and the American way".

Meet John Doe (1941) 

In 1941 Capra directed Meet John Doe (1941), which some consider Capra's most controversial movie. The film's hero, played by Gary Cooper, is a former baseball player now bumming around, lacking goals. He is selected by a news reporter to represent the "common man," to capture the imagination of ordinary Americans. The film was released shortly before America became involved in World War II, and citizens were still in an isolationist mood. According to some historians, the film was made to convey a "deliberate reaffirmation of American values," though ones that seemed uncertain with respect to the future.

Film author Richard Glazer speculates that the film may have been autobiographical, "reflecting Capra's own uncertainties". Glazer describes how, "John's accidental transformation from drifter to national figure parallels Capra's own early drifting experience and subsequent involvement in movie making ... Meet John Doe, then, was an attempt to work out his own fears and questions."

World War II years (1941–1945)

Joining the Army after Pearl Harbor 

Within four days after the Japanese Attack on Pearl Harbor on December 7, 1941, Capra quit his successful directing career in Hollywood and received a commission as a major in the United States Army. He also gave up his presidency of the Screen Directors Guild. Being 44 years of age, he was not asked to enlist, but, notes Friedman, "Capra had an intense desire to prove his patriotism to his adopted land."

Capra recalls some personal reasons for enlisting:

Why We Fight series 

During the next four years of World War II, Capra's job was to head a special section on morale to explain to soldiers "why the hell they're in uniform", writes Capra, and were not "propaganda" films like those created by the Nazis and Japan. Capra directed or co-directed seven documentary war information films.

Capra was assigned to work directly under Chief of Staff George C. Marshall, the most senior officer in command of the Army, who later created the Marshall Plan and was awarded a Nobel Peace Prize. Marshall chose to bypass the usual documentary film-making department, Signal Corps, because he felt they were not capable of producing "sensitive and objective troop information films". One colonel explained the importance of these future films to Capra:

During his first meeting with General Marshall, Capra was told his mission:

Capra ended up directing a seven-episode Why We Fight series: Prelude to War (1942), The Nazis Strike (1942), Divide and Conquer (1943), The Battle of Britain (1943), The Battle of Russia (1943), The Battle of China (1944), and War Comes to America (1945). Additionally, Capra directed or co-directed the propaganda films Tunisian Victory (1945) Know Your Enemy: Japan (1945), Here Is Germany (1945), and Two Down and One to Go (1945), which do not bear the Why We Fight banner. Capra also produced the critically-acclaimed The Negro Soldier (1944), which was directed by Stuart Heisler. Capra also directed, uncredited, the 13-minute film Your Job in Germany (1945), which was meant for US troops headed to Allied-occupied Germany.

After he completed the first few documentaries, government officials and U.S. Army staff felt they were powerful messages and excellent presentations of why it was necessary for the United States to fight in the war. All footage came from military and government sources, whereas during earlier years, many newsreels secretly used footage from enemy sources. Animated charts were created by Walt Disney and his animators. A number of Hollywood composers wrote the background music, including Alfred Newman and Russian-born composer Dimitri Tiomkin. After the first complete film was viewed by General Marshall along with U.S. Army staff—and Franklin Roosevelt—Marshall approached Capra: "Colonel Capra, how did you do it? That is a most wonderful thing."

FDR was effusive: "I want every American to see this motion picture.  General--please make all necessary arrangements". Prelude To War was distributed by 20th Century-Fox, and was nationally acclaimed.  Fox also released Capra's Why We Fight opus, The Battle Of Russia.  Released to service audiences in two-parts to accommodate hour-long periods during induction training, the nine-reel (nearly 90 minutes) epic detailed Russian history using excerpts of the films of Sergei Eisenstein, then proceeded to recent history through captured Nazi newsreels and those supplied reluctantly by Stalin. When he was shown the film in Moscow, Stalin was effusive and ordered one thousand 35mm prints.  He was so anxious that his people should see the film that he did not bother creating a Russian soundtrack.  Capra laughed in amazement years later when re-counting the tale: "Stalin had interpreters at the side of the stage in all the theatres.  They simply translated the film on the fly, yelling like hell to be heard over the music and sound effects". The series was seen in theaters throughout the U.S. They were also translated into French, Spanish, Portuguese, and Chinese for screening in other countries, under the aegis of Robert Riskin. Winston Churchill ordered that all of them be shown to the British public in theaters.  

Following a shifting of alliances at the end of World War II, some of the Why We Fight films were effectively banned. The Battle Of Russia, due to its positivity toward the Soviet Union, was essentially banned until the 1980s. Conversely, some of the other films, which spoke negatively of the Germans and Japanese, were taken out of print, as these countries were now allies. Know Your Enemy: Japan, which barely saw a release because its release date came just days before the Japanese surrender, was kept under wraps afterwards as well: Capra noted that the U.S. "suddenly needed friendly relations with the Japs and the film, along with several others, was locked up".

The Why We Fight series is widely considered a masterpiece of war information documentaries. Prelude to War, the first in the series, won the 1942 Academy Award for Best Documentary Feature. When his career ended, Capra regarded these films as his most important works. He was discharged from the service in 1945 as a colonel, having been awarded the Legion of Merit in 1943, the Distinguished Service Medal in 1945, the World War I Victory Medal (for his service in World War I), the American Defense Service Medal, the American Campaign Medal and the World War II Victory Medal.

Post-war career (1946–1961)

It's a Wonderful Life (1946) 
After the war ended, along with directors William Wyler and George Stevens, Capra founded Liberty Films. Their studio became the first independent company of directors since United Artists in 1919 whose goal was to make films without interference by studio bosses. However, the only pictures completed by the studio were It's a Wonderful Life (1946) and State of the Union (1948). The first of these was a box office disappointment but was nominated for five Academy Awards.

While the film did not resonate with audiences in 1946, its popularity has grown through the years, partly due to frequent airings during those years it was commonly known to be in the public domain. Through legal manipulation, Paramount, successor-in-interest to NTA/Republic, made a false claim of having "retrieved" the film's copyright from the public domain. (Under American law, no work that ever enters the Public Domain may ever have its copyright restored.) But none of the literally dozens of tape purveyors selling public domain copies of the film was willing to spend the money required to bring a challenge in court, when the upshot of their victory would be that everyone in the business—not just them—could exploit the film in the public domain. The only challenge to date, by the children and families of the actors who played the Bailey Children in the film, was settled out of court. The claims made as to song copyrights in the soundtrack protecting the film have become moot, with "California, Here I Come" lapsing into the public domain. The film's copyright status remains in flux. In 1998, the American Film Institute (AFI) named it one of the best films ever made, putting it at 11th on AFI's 100 Years...100 Movies list of the top American films of all time. In 2006, the AFI put the film at the top of its AFI's 100 Years...100 Cheers list, ranking what AFI considers the most inspirational American movies of all time. It would become Capra's last film to win major acclaim—his successful years were now behind him, although he directed five more films over the next 14 years.

For State of the Union (1948), Capra changed studios. It would be the only time he ever worked for Metro-Goldwyn-Mayer. Although the project had an excellent pedigree with stars Spencer Tracy and Katharine Hepburn, the film was not a success, and Capra's statement, "I think State of the Union was my most perfect film in handling people and ideas" has few adherents today.

Representing U.S. at International Film Festival 
In January 1952, the U.S. Ambassador to India asked Capra to represent the U.S. film industry at an International Film Festival to be held in India. A State Department friend of Capra asked him and explained why his trip would be important:

After two weeks in India, Capra discovered that Bowles' fears were warranted, as many film sessions were used by Russian and Chinese representatives to give long political speeches. At a lunch with 15 Indian directors and producers, he stressed that "they must preserve freedom as artists, and that any government control would hinder that freedom. A totalitarian system—and they would become nothing but publicity men for the party in power." Capra had a difficult time communicating this, however, as he noted in his diary:

When he returned to Washington to give his report, Secretary of State Dean Acheson gave Capra his commendation for "virtually single-handedly forestalling a possible Communist take-over of Indian films". Ambassador Bowles also conveyed gratitude to Capra for "one helluva job".

Disillusionment period and later years 
Following It's a Wonderful Life and State of the Union, which were done soon after the war ended, Capra's themes were becoming out of step with changes in the film industry and the public mood. Friedman finds that while Capra's ideas were popular with depression-era and prewar audiences, they became less relevant to a prospering post-war America. Capra had become "disconnected from an American culture that had changed" during the previous decade. Biographer Joseph McBride argues that Capra's disillusionment was more related to the negative effect that the House Un-American Activities Committee (HUAC) had on the film industry in general. The HUAC interrogations in the early 1950s ended many Hollywood careers. Capra himself was not called to testify, although he was a prime target of the committee due to his past associations with many Hollywood blacklisted screenwriters.

Capra blamed his early retirement from films on the rising power of stars, which forced him to continually compromise his artistic vision. He also claimed that increasing budgetary and scheduling demands had constrained his creative abilities. Film historian Michael Medved agreed with Capra, noting that he walked away from the movie business because "he refused to adjust to the cynicism of the new order." In his autobiography, written in 1971, Capra expressed his feelings about the shifting film industry:

Capra added that in his opinion, "practically all the Hollywood film-making of today is stooping to cheap salacious pornography in a crazy bastardization of a great art to compete for the 'patronage' of deviates and masturbators."

Capra remained employable in Hollywood during and after the HUAC hearings but chose nonetheless to demonstrate his loyalty by attempting to re-enlist in the Army at the outbreak of the Korean War, in 1950. He was rejected due to his age. He was later invited to join the Defense Department's newly formed Think Tank project, VISTA, but was denied the necessary clearance. According to Friedman, "these two rejections were devastating to the man who had made a career of demonstrating American ideals in film", along with his directing award-winning documentary films for the Army.

Later films (1950–1961) 
Capra directed two films at Paramount Pictures starring Bing Crosby, Riding High (1950) and Here Comes the Groom (1951). By 1952, at the age of 55, Capra effectively retired from Hollywood filmmaking; he shifted to working with the California Institute of Technology, his alma mater, to produce educational films on science topics.

From 1952 to 1956, Capra produced four science-related television specials in color for The Bell System Science Series: Our Mr. Sun (1956), Hemo the Magnificent (1957), The Strange Case of the Cosmic Rays (1957), and Meteora: The Unchained Goddess (1958). These educational science documentaries were popular favorites for school science classrooms for around 30 years. It was eight years before he directed another theatrical film, A Hole in the Head (1959) with Frank Sinatra and Edward G. Robinson, his first feature film in color. His final theatrical film was with Glenn Ford and Bette Davis, named Pocketful of Miracles (1961), a remake of his 1933 film Lady for a Day. In the mid-1960s he worked on pre-production for an adaptation of Martin Caidin's novel Marooned, but he felt he could not make the movie on the $3 million budget he was given, and abandoned the project. (A film adaptation was finally made in 1969, directed by John Sturges with an $8 million budget.)

Capra's final film, Rendezvous in Space (1964), was an industrial film made for the Martin Marietta Company and shown at the 1964 New York World's Fair. It was exhibited at the New York Hall of Science after the Fair ended.

Directing style 
Capra's directing style relied on improvisation to a great extent. He was noted for going on the set with no more than the master scenes written. He explained his reasoning:

According to some experts, Capra used great, unobtrusive craftsmanship when directing, and felt it was bad directing to distract the audience with fancy technical gimmicks. Film historian and author William S. Pechter described Capra's style as one "of almost classical purity". He adds that his style relied on editing to help his films sustain a "sequence of rhythmic motion". Pechter describes its effect:

Film critic John Raeburn discusses an early Capra film, American Madness (1932), as an example of how he had mastered the movie medium and expressed a unique style:

As for Capra's subject matter, film author Richard Griffith tries to summarize Capra's common theme:

Capra's personality when directing gave him a reputation for "fierce independence" when dealing with studio bosses. On the set he was said to be gentle and considerate, "a director who displays absolutely no exhibitionism." As Capra's films often carry a message about basic goodness in human nature, and show the value of unselfishness and hard work, his wholesome, feel-good themes have led some cynics to term his style "Capra-corn". However, those who hold his vision in higher regard prefer the term "Capraesque".

Capra's basic themes of championing the common man, as well as his use of spontaneous, fast-paced dialogue and goofy, memorable lead and supporting characters, made him one of the most popular and respected filmmakers of the 20th century. His influence can be traced in the works of many directors, including Robert Altman, Ron Howard, Masaki Kobayashi, Akira Kurosawa, John Lasseter, David Lynch, John Milius, Martin Scorsese, Steven Spielberg, Oliver Stone and François Truffaut.

Personal life 

Capra married actress Helen Howell in 1923. They divorced in 1928. He married Lucille Warner in 1932, with whom he had a daughter and three sons, one of whom, Johnny, died at age 3 following a tonsillectomy.

Capra was four times president of the Academy of Motion Picture Arts and Sciences and three times president of the Directors Guild of America, which he helped found. Under his presidency, he worked to give directors more artistic control of their films. During his career as a director, he retained an early ambition to teach science, and after his career declined in the 1950s, he made educational television films related to science subjects.

Physically, Capra was short, stocky, and vigorous, and enjoyed outdoor activities such as hunting, fishing, and mountain climbing. In his later years, he spent time writing short stories and songs, along with playing guitar. He collected fine and rare books during the 1930s and 1940s. Six hundred and forty items from his "distinguished library" were sold by Parke-Bernet Galleries at auction in New York in April 1949, realizing $68,000 ($ today).

His son Frank Capra Jr. was the president of EUE Screen Gems Studios in Wilmington, North Carolina, until his death on December 19, 2007. His grandsons, brothers Frank Capra III and Jonathan Capra, have both worked as assistant directors; Frank III worked on the 1995 film The American President, which referred to Frank Capra in the film's dialogue.

Political views 

Capra's political views coalesced in his movies, which promoted and celebrated the spirit of American individualism. A conservative Republican, Capra railed against Franklin D. Roosevelt during his tenure as governor of New York and opposed his presidency during the years of the Depression. Capra stood against government intervention during the national economic crisis.

In his later years, Capra became a self-described pacifist and was very critical of the Vietnam War.

Religious views 

Capra wrote in his early adulthood that he was a "Christmas Catholic".

In his later years, Capra returned to the Catholic Church and described himself as "a Catholic in spirit; one who firmly believes that the anti-moral, the intellectual bigots, and the Mafias of ill will may destroy religion, but they will never conquer the cross".

Death 
In 1985, aged 88, Capra suffered the first of a series of strokes. On September 3, 1991, he died of a heart attack in his sleep at his home in La Quinta, California, at the age of 94. He was interred at Coachella Valley Public Cemetery in Coachella, California.

He left part of his  ranch in Fallbrook, California, to the California Institute of Technology, to be used as a retreat center. Capra's personal papers and some film-related materials are contained in the Wesleyan University Cinema Archives, which allows scholars and media experts full access.

Legacy 
During the golden age of Hollywood, Capra's "fantasies of goodwill" made him one of the two or three most famous and successful directors in the world. Film historian Ian Freer notes that at the time of his death in 1991, his legacy remained intact:

Director/actor John Cassavetes contemplating Capra's contribution to film quipped: "Maybe there really wasn't an America, it was only Frank Capra." Capra's films were his love letters to an idealized America—a cinematic landscape of his own invention. The performances his actors gave were invariable portrayals of personalities developed into recognizable images of popular culture, "their acting has the bold simplicity of an icon ..."

Like his contemporary, director John Ford, Capra defined and aggrandized the tropes of mythic America where individual courage invariably triumphs over collective evil. Film historian Richard Griffith speaks of Capra's "... reliance on sentimental conversation and the ultimate benevolence of ordinary America to resolve all deep conflicts." "Average America" is visualized as "... a tree-lined street, undistinguished frame houses surrounded by modest areas of grass, a few automobiles. For certain purposes, it assumed that all real Americans live in towns like this, and so great is the power of myth, even the born city-dweller is likely to believe vaguely that he too lives on this shady street, or comes from it, or is going to."

NYU professor Leonard Quart writes:

Although Capra's stature as a director had declined in the 1950s, his films underwent a revival in the 1960s:

French film historian John Raeburn, editor of Cahiers du cinéma, noted that Capra's films were unknown in France, but there too his films underwent a fresh discovery by the public. He believes the reason for his renewed popularity had to do with his themes, which he made credible "an ideal conception of an American national character":

In 1982, the American Film Institute honored Capra by giving him their AFI Life Achievement Award. The event was used to create the television film, The American Film Institute Salute to Frank Capra, hosted by James Stewart. In 1986, Capra received the National Medal of Arts. During his acceptance speech for the AFI award, Capra stressed his most important values:

Capra expanded on his visions in his 1971 autobiography, The Name Above the Title:

Awards and honors 

The Why We Fight series earned Capra the Legion of Merit in 1943 and the Distinguished Service Medal in 1945.

In 1957, Capra was awarded the George Eastman Award, given by George Eastman House for distinguished contribution to the art of film.

Los Angeles Mayor Sam Yorty, by a vote of the city council, declared May 12, 1962 as "Frank Capra Day". George Sidney, President of the Directors Guild stated that "This is the first time in the history of Hollywood, that the city of Los Angeles has officially recognized a creative talent." At the event ceremony, director John Ford announced that Capra had also received an honorary Order of the British Empire (OBE) on the recommendation of Winston Churchill. Ford suggested publicly to Capra:

In 1966, Capra was awarded the Distinguished Alumni Award from his alma mater Caltech. (see section "Early Life", supra)

In 1972, Capra received the Golden Plate Award of the American Academy of Achievement.

In 1974, Capra was awarded the Inkpot Award.

In 1975, Capra was awarded the Golden Anchor Award by the U.S Naval Reserve's Combat Camera Group for his contribution to World War II Naval photography and production of the "Why We Fight" series. The award ceremony included a video salute by President Ford. Attending were many of Capra's favorite actors including Jimmy Stewart, Donna Reed, Pat O'Brien, Jean Arthur, and others.

An annual It's a Wonderful Life celebration that Capra attended in 1981, during which he said, "This is one of the proudest moments of my life," was recounted in The New Yorker.

He was nominated six times for Best Director and seven times for Outstanding Production/Best Picture. Out of six nominations for Best Director, Capra received the award three times. He briefly held the record for winning the most Best Director Oscars when he won for the third time in 1938, until this record was matched by John Ford in 1941, and then later surpassed by Ford in 1952. William Wyler also matched this record upon winning his third Oscar in 1959.

The Academy Film Archive has preserved two of Capra's films, The Matinee Idol (1928) and Two Down and One to Go (1945).

Academy Awards

Other awards 

American Film Institute
 Life Achievement Award (1982)

Directors Guild of America
 Best Director Nomination for A Hole in the Head (1959)
 Life Achievement Award (1959)
 Best Director Nomination for Pocketful of Miracles (1961)

Golden Globe Award
 Best Director Award for It's a Wonderful Life (1946)

Venice Film Festival
 Mussolini Cups for best foreign film Nomination for It Happened One Night (1934)
 Mussolini Cups for best foreign film Nomination for Mr. Deeds Goes to Town (1936)
 Golden Lion (1982)

American Film Institute recognition
 AFI's 100 Years...100 Movies (10th Anniversary Edition)
 It's a Wonderful Life ... #20
 Mr. Smith Goes to Washington ... #26
 It Happened One Night ... #46
 AFI's 100 Years...100 Cheers
 It's a Wonderful Life ... #1
 Mr. Smith Goes to Washington ... #5
 Meet John Doe ... #49
 Mr. Deeds Goes to Town ... #83
 AFI's 100 Years...100 Laughs
 It Happened One Night ... #8
 Arsenic and Old Lace ... #30
 Mr. Deeds Goes to Town ... #70
 AFI's 100 Years...100 Passions
 It's a Wonderful Life ... #8
 It Happened One Night ... #38
 AFI's 100 Years...100 Heroes & Villains
 50 greatest movie heroes
 It's a Wonderful Life ... George Bailey ... #9
 Mr. Smith Goes to Washington ... Jefferson Smith ... #11
 50 greatest movie villains
 It's a Wonderful Life ... Mr. Potter ... #6
 AFI's 10 Top 10
 Fantasy
 It's a Wonderful Life ... #3
 Romantic Comedies
 It Happened One Night ... #3

United States National Film Registry
 The Strong Man (1926)
 It Happened One Night (1934)
 Lost Horizon (1937)
 Mr. Smith Goes to Washington (1939)
 Why We Fight series of seven films (1942)
 It's a Wonderful Life (1946)

Filmography

See also 
 The Bell System Science Series
 Frank Capra at the First International Film Festival of India, 1952

Notes

References

Bibliography 

 Barney, Richard A. David Lynch: Interviews (Conversations with Filmmakers Series). Jackson, Mississippi: University Press of Mississippi, 2009. 
 Barson, Michael. The Illustrated Who's Who of Hollywood Directors: The Sound Era.  New York: Noonday Press, 1995. 
 Beauchamp, Cari. Joseph P. Kennedy Presents: His Hollywood Years. New York: Vintage, 2010. 
 Brooks, Patricia and Johnathan. "Chapter 8: East L.A. and the Desert." Laid to Rest in California: A Guide to the Cemeteries and Grave Sites of the Rich and Famous. Guilford, Connecticut: Globe Pequot Press, 2006. 
 Capra, Frank. Frank Capra, The Name Above the Title: An Autobiography. New York: The Macmillan Company, 1971. . 
Digitized on the HathiTrust Digital Library, Limited view (search only) .
 Chandler, Charlotte. The Girl Who Walked Home Alone: Bette Davis, A Personal Biography. New York: Simon & Schuster, 2006. 
 Dickstein, Morris. Dancing in The Dark: A Cultural History of The Great Depression. New York: W.W. Norton & Company, 2010. 
 Dixon, Wheeler W. The Early Film Criticism of Francois Truffaut. Bloomington, Indiana: Indiana University Press, 1993. 
 Freer, Ian. Movie Makers: 50 Iconic Directors from Chaplin to the Coen Brothers. London: Quercus Publishing Plc, 2009. 
 Kotsabilas-Davis, James and Myrna Loy. Being and Becoming. New York: Primus, Donald I Fine Inc., 1987. 
 Lazere, Donald. American Media and Mass Culture: Left Perspectives. Berkeley, California: University of California Press, 1987. 
 Medved, Michael. Hollywood vs. America: Popular Culture and the War on Traditional Values. New York: HarperCollins, 1992. 
 McBride, Joseph. Frank Capra: The Catastrophe of Success. New York: Touchstone Books, 1992. 
 Oderman, Stuart. Talking To the Piano Player: Silent Film Stars, Writers and Directors Remember. Albany, Georgia: BearManor Media, 2005. 
 Poague, Leland. Frank Capra: Interviews (Conversations With Filmmakers Series). Jackson, Mississippi: University Press of Mississippi, 2004. 
 Pendergast, Tom and Sara, eds. St. James Encyclopedia of Popular Culture, Vol. 1. Detroit: St. James Press, 2000. 
 Stevens, George Jr. Conversations with the Great Moviemakers of Hollywood's Golden Age. New York: Alfred A. Knopf, 2006. 
 
 Wakeman, John, ed. World Film Directors: Volume One, 1890–1945. New York: H.W. Wilson Co., 1987. 
 Wiley, Mason and Damien Bona. Inside Oscar: The Unofficial History of the Academy Awards. New York: Ballantine Books, 1987. 
 Wilson, Victoria. A Life of Barbara Stanwyck: Steel-True 1907–1940. New York: Simon & Schuster, 2013,

External links 

 Capra Smith and Doe: Filming the American Hero from American Studies at the University of Virginia
 
 
 Bibliography
 Capra before he became "Capraesque" BFI Sight & Sound magazine November 2010 article on Capra's early career, by Joseph McBride
 
 
 
 
 
 
 Frank Capra at the 1971 San Francisco International Festival

1897 births
1991 deaths
American anti-communists
American electrical engineers
American pacifists
United States Army personnel of World War I
United States Army personnel of World War II
Best Directing Academy Award winners
Best Director Golden Globe winners
Presidents of the Academy of Motion Picture Arts and Sciences
Presidents of the Directors Guild of America
Naturalized citizens of the United States
California Institute of Technology alumni
American people of Italian descent
Propaganda film directors
Recipients of the Distinguished Service Medal (US Army)
Italian emigrants to the United States
United States National Medal of Arts recipients
Burials at Coachella Valley Public Cemetery
American male screenwriters
Inkpot Award winners
Film producers from California
United States Army Air Forces officers
First Motion Picture Unit personnel
United States Army colonels
Honorary Officers of the Order of the British Empire
People from La Quinta, California
People from Lincoln Heights, Los Angeles
AFI Life Achievement Award recipients
Film directors from California
Catholics from California
Screenwriters from California
Engineers from California
20th-century American engineers
California Republicans
20th-century American male writers
20th-century American screenwriters
Old Right (United States)
United States Army Signal Corps personnel
United States Army Air Forces personnel of World War II